A planula is the free-swimming, flattened, ciliated, bilaterally symmetric larval form of various cnidarian species and also in some species of Ctenophores. Some groups of Nemerteans also produce larvae that are very similar to the planula, which are called planuliform larva.

Development

The planula forms either from the fertilized egg of a medusa, as is the case in scyphozoans and some hydrozoans, or from a polyp, as in the case of anthozoans.

Depending on the species, the planula either metamorphoses directly into a free-swimming, miniature version of the mobile adult form, or navigates through the water until it reaches a hard substrate (many may prefer specific substrates) where it anchors and grows into a polyp. The miniature-adult types include many open-ocean scyphozoans. The attaching types include all anthozoans with a planula stage, many coastal scyphozoans, and some hydrozoans.

Feeding and locomotion
The planulae of the subphylum Medusozoa have no mouth, and no digestive tract, and are unable to feed themselves, while those of Anthozoa can feed.

Planula larvae swim with the aboral end (the end opposite the mouth) in front.

References 

Cnidarian biology
Larvae